TAC (acronym of Transporte Aéreo de Colombia) is a charter airline based at Alfonso Bonilla Aragón International Airport in Cali, Colombia.

History
The airline was founded in Manizales, Caldas; as TAC (Taxi Aéreo de Caldas) in 1995. In 2008, the company was renamed Transporte Aéreo de Colombia.

Destinations

Fleet

TAC Colombia operates the following aircraft (at September 2020):

TAC Colombia are also looking at getting Embraer Phenom 300's in the future.

Accidents and incidents
On 14 December 1977, Vickers Viscount HK-1267 was damaged beyond repair at Palo Negro International Airport, Bucaramanga.

On 26 June 2009, a TAC LET-410 UVP overran the runway upon landing at Capurganá Airport, Chocó. All 21 survive; 3 crew, 18 passengers.

References

External links

 Official Airline Site 
 aeropuertosarg.com.ar

Airlines of Colombia
Airlines established in 1995
Colombian companies established in 1995